The 2019–20 Angolan Basketball League was the 42nd season of the Angolan Basketball League, the highest premier basketball league in Angola. On 14 May 2020, the FAB announced the season was cancelled due to the COVID-19 pandemic.

Teams
Helmarc Academia withdrew from the league.
<onlyinclude>{| class="wikitable sortable"  
|-
! Club
! Location
! Venue
! Capacity
|-
| ASA || Luanda || Pavilhão da Cidadela || align=center|
|-
| Helmarc Academia || Luanda || Pavilhão Multiusos do Kilamba || align=center | 
|-
| Interclube || Luanda || Pavilhão 28 de Fevereiro || align=center|
|-
| Marinha || Luanda || Pavilhão Victorino Cunha || align=center|
|-
| Petro de Luanda || Luanda || Pavilhão da Cidadela ||  align=center| 
|-
| Primeiro de Agosto || Luanda || Pavilhão Victorino Cunha || align=center| 
|-
|  Universidade Lusíada || Luanda || Pavilhão Anexo || align=center|
|-
|  Vila Clotilde || Luanda || Pavilhão Anexo || align=center|
|-
| Kwanza || Luanda || Pavilhão Victorino Cunha || align=center| 
|}

Regular season

References

External links
AfroBasket season page

Angolan Basketball League seasons
League
Angola